Molossoi is a former municipality in the Ioannina regional unit, Epirus, Greece. Since the 2011 local government reform it is part of the municipality Zitsa, of which it is a municipal unit. The municipal unit has an area of 241.281 km2. In 2011 its population was 1,646.  The seat of the municipality is in Voutsaras.

Subdivisions
The municipal unit Molossoi is subdivided into the following communities (constituent villages in brackets):
Aetopetra (Aetopetra, Kato Aetopetra)
Chinka (Chinka, Laliza, Zorgiani)
Despotiko
Dovla (Dovla, Fteri)
Ekklisochori
Foteino (Foteino, Kournorrachi)
Giourganista (Agios Christoforos)
Grimpovo (Grimpovo, Seltsana)
Granitsa
Granitsopoula
Kalochori
Kourenta (Kourenta, Petsali)
Polydoro
Radovizi (Radovizi, Dichouni)
Rizo
Vereniki (Vereniki, Venterikos, Kato Vereniki, Palaiochora)
Voutsaras
Vrosina (Vrosina, Agios Georgios)
Vrysoula
Zalongo (Zalongo, Kato Zalongo)

Population

See also

List of settlements in the Ioannina regional unit

External links
Molossoi at the GTP Travel Pages

References

Populated places in Ioannina (regional unit)